The 7th Canadian Folk Music Awards were held on December 4, 2011, at the Isabel Bader Theatre in Toronto, Ontario.

Nominees and recipients
Recipients are listed first and highlighted in boldface.

References

External links
Canadian Folk Music Awards

07
Canadian Folk Music Awards
Canadian Folk Music Awards
Canadian Folk Music Awards
Canadian Folk Music Awards